Khosrowabad (also Romanized as Khosrowābād; also known as Khosroābād) is a village in Deris Rural District, in the Central District of Kazerun County, Fars Province, Iran. At the 2006 census, its population was 1,118, in 237 families.

References 

Populated places in Kazerun County